The 1998 USISL D-3 Pro League was the 12th season of third-division soccer in the United States, and was the second season of now-defunct USISL D-3 Pro League. The champions were the Chicago Stingers who beat the New Hampshire Phantoms in the final.

Changes from 1996 

Before the season, Western Massachusetts, Northern Virginia, and Pensacola were added.  Baltimore became Eastern Shore.  Dallas became Texas.  Vermont became the Voltage.  Miami was promoted from PDSL.

Name Changes 

 Vermont Wanderers rebranded as Vermont Voltage
 Baltimore Bays rebranded as Eastern Shore Sharks
 Dallas Toros rebranded as Texas Toros

New Clubs

Folding or Moving 

No teams left the league nor folded.

Teams

Head coaching changes

Season Overview

Standings

Northeast Division

Mid-Atlantic Division

Atlantic Division

Southeast Division

North Central Division

South Central Division

West Division

Playoffs

Divisional Semifinals 
Higher seed/home team on the left.

Division Finals 

 Austin defeated Texas 1-0
 Charlotte defeated Myrtle Beach, 8-3
 Delaware defeated Roanoke, 2-1
 New Hampshire defeated Rhode Island, 3-2
 Chicago defeated Indiana, 3-0
 Central Jersey defeated Reading, 3-0
 Arizona defeated Stanislaus County 2-1

Quarterfinals 

 New Hampshire defeated Central Jersey, 3-0
 Chicago defeated Delaware 1-0
 Orlando defeated Charlotte, 3-2
 Austin defeated Arizona 1-0

Semifinals 

 Chicago defeated Orlando, 2-0
 New Hampshire defeated Austin, 3-2 (OT)

Championship 

Chicago defeated New Hampshire, 3-2 (OT)

Top goalscorers

Statistics

References
Footnotes
A : Deducted one point due to fielding ineligible players.
General References

1998
3